The Darragh House is a historic house in Little Rock, Arkansas.  It is a -story frame structure, its exterior finished in brick and stucco, with a side gable roof pierced by broad shed-roof dormers, giving it a Dutch Colonial feel.  The roof hangs over a recessed porch, supported by oversized Tuscan columns.  Built about 1916, the house is a distinctive local example of the work of noted Arkansas architect Charles L. Thompson.

The house was listed on the U.S. National Register of Historic Places in 1982.

See also
National Register of Historic Places listings in Little Rock, Arkansas

References

Houses on the National Register of Historic Places in Arkansas
Colonial Revival architecture in Arkansas
Houses completed in 1916
Houses in Little Rock, Arkansas
National Register of Historic Places in Little Rock, Arkansas